The Naval Battle of Papudo was a naval engagement fought between Spanish and Chilean forces on November 26, 1865, during the Chincha Islands War. It was fought 55 miles north of Valparaiso, Chile, near the coastal town of Papudo.

Background
Until November 1865, Chile had been the only country firm in its declaration of war against Spain, which desired to recapture its lost South American colonies. Through the efforts of its president, Mariano Ignacio Prado, Peru was subsequently galvanized into action against Spain.

Familiar with Spanish naval movements, the Chilean corvette Esmeralda, under the command of Juan Williams Rebolledo, and whose crew included Arturo Prat, Juan José Latorre and Carlos Condell, waited for any Spanish ships to appear between Coquimbo and Valparaíso.

The Chileans hoisted a British flag on their ship and maneuvered themselves close to the Spanish ship Virgen de Covadonga, under the command of Luis Fery (or Ferry), who thought that the ship may have been one of the similarly built British vessels Shearwater, Colombina, or Mutine. The Esmeralda opened fire on the Covadonga, which returned fire, but the Chilean gunners proved more skillful. After the Covadonga received severe hits that incapacitated its crew, the Spaniards attempted to escape, but it was too late. The Esmeralda followed her, continuing to fire. Fery called out his surrender to Williams Rebolledo, who ordered Manuel Thomson to take possession of the Spanish ship. Chilean engineers then worked to save the captured vessel. All in all, the battle lasted only half an hour.

In addition to Commander Fery, six Spanish officers, and 115 sailors were taken as prisoners. The Chileans also captured the correspondence of Spanish Admiral Juan Manuel Pareja. This action, together with the general failure of Spanish operations during the Chincha Islands War, led to Pareja committing suicide on board his flagship a few days later.

Covadonga, now a vessel in the Chilean Navy, later saw combat in the Battle of Iquique during the War of the Pacific.

External links
 Description of the battle 

History of South America
Naval battles involving Spain
Naval battles involving Chile
Battles of the Chincha Islands War
History of Valparaíso Region
Conflicts in 1865
1865 in Chile
November 1865 events